Pindigheb (or Pindi Gheb) , is a town in Punjab province Pakistan and seat of Pindi Gheb Tehsil (an administrative subdivision) of  Attock District. Western route of China Pakistan Economic Corridor (CPEC) passes through Pindigheb.

History
The Imperial Gazetteer of India, compiled over a century ago during British rule, described the town as follows: Pindi Gheb Town - Imperial Gazetteer of India, v. 20, p. 147.

In 997 CE, Sultan Mahmud Ghaznavi, took over the Ghaznavid dynasty empire established by his father, Sultan Sebuktegin, In 1005 he conquered the Shahis in Kabul in 1005, and followed it by the conquests of Punjab region. The Delhi Sultanate and later Mughal Empire ruled the region. The Punjab region became predominantly Muslim due to missionary Sufi saints whose dargahs dot the landscape of Punjab region.

After the decline of the Mughal Empire, the Sikh invaded and occupied Attock District. The Muslims faced severe restrictions during the Sikh rule . During the period of British rule, Attock District increased in population and importance.

The predominantly Muslim population supported Muslim League and Pakistan Movement. After the independence of Pakistan in 1947.
The name of incumbent Assistant Commissioner of Pindi Gheb sub division is Ijaz Abdul Karim.

Language
As with the rest of Pakistan, Urdu has official status. However, the language variety spoken natively in the area is Ghebi – a Hindko dialect that is closely related to Chacchi and Awankari.

References

Bibliography 

 Gazetteer of Attock 1934

Cities and towns in Attock District